In 1899, the Vinita Electric Light, Ice and Power Company, which was headquartered in the Indian Territory town of Vinita (now in Oklahoma) obtained a charter to provide electric power to that community. In 1913, the company consolidated with similar independent companies in Tulsa, Guthrie, Coalgate, Lehigh and Atoka to form a new company, named Public Service Company of Oklahoma (PSO). The founder and first president of PSO was Frederick William "Fred" Insull, who moved the company's headquarters to Tulsa in 1916. 

The Public Service Co. of Oklahoma Building, originally completed in 1929, was the headquarters of the electric service utility in Tulsa, Oklahoma, Public Service Co. of Oklahoma (PSC). It was known by that name until its owner (then known as PSO) was acquired by Central & Southwest Corporation (CSC), a major utility holding company, when the building was renamed as the PSO Building. CSC was later acquired by a larger holding company, American Electric Power Company, which retained PSO as an operating company serving customers in the state of Oklahoma. It was listed on the National Register of Historic Places (NRIS #84003443) on  April 10, 1984. It was added as a Contributing Property to the Oil Capital Historic District in 2010.

PSO vacated this building and sold it to a California real estate investor in 2005. PSO then moved its personnel to the former Central High School building in downtown Tulsa, moves which were completed in 2007. The investor, Maurice Kanbar held the building until 2012, when he sold it, as part of a package, to Stuart Price, one of his associates. The new owner decided to repurpose the building from corporate offices to luxury apartments, and spent several years thoroughly renovating the interior. He also renamed the building Art Deco Lofts and Apartments. Apartment buyers began moving into the building in mid 2016.

Building history
Arthur M. Atkinson was the principal architect for the building when it was constructed in 1928-9. Joseph R. Koberling Jr. was the designer. The cost of constructing the building was reportedly $425,000 in 1929 dollars.

Structure
The building is constructed of reinforced concrete, with a structural steel frame, and a covering of light gray Bedford limestone. All the windows have steel frames. The ground floor has large display windows, since PSO also promoted and sold electric appliances during its early life, to promote its main product - electricity. These display windows are decorated with Gothic-type arches, which were often used in a predecessor of Art Deco style.

PSO reportedly instructed Atkinson and Koberling that they should feature exterior lighting, which was a novel concept in 1929.

Repurposing the building
Soon after this building was purchased in 2005 by California real estate investor Maurice Kanbar, PSO moved its headquarters to the former Tulsa Central High School Building, which had already moved into a new building in northwest Tulsa. Kanbar held the almost empty building until 2012, when he sold it to a former business partner, Stuart Price. About that time, it was announced that the building would be repurposed - in this case converted to a residential facility.

At the end of July, 2016, the building had been renamed Art Deco Lofts and Apartments, and the newest residents began moving in.

Restructuring of the energy industry created a substantial glut of office space in Tulsa during the late 20th Century and early 21st Century, as companies downsized their Tulsa operations. Many companies moved entire operations to other cities, especially Houston. Many large, well-known buildings soon became vacant, and were put up for sale by the former owners. Professional real estate developers moved in to buy up many of these distressed properties.

Notes

References 

1929 establishments in Oklahoma
Adaptive reuse of industrial structures in the United States
Art Deco architecture in Oklahoma
Office buildings completed in 1929
American Electric Power
Office buildings in Tulsa, Oklahoma
Residential buildings in Tulsa, Oklahoma